Helen Parker may refer to:
Helen Eugenia Parker, American architect
Helen Parker (musician), producer of So F**king Rock Live
Helen Parker, character, see List of Heartbeat episodes
Helen Parker, character in Scattergood Baines
Helen Parker, character in Lord Babs
The Old-Fashioned Dress: Portrait of Miss Helen Parker, see List of works by Thomas Eakins

See also
Ellen Parker (disambiguation)